TFM may refer to:

 TFM (radio), North-East England
 Transformice, a French online game in which the player controls a mouse to get cheese
 TFM (piscicide), a piscicide 
 Grupo Transportación Ferroviaria Mexicana, a railroad
 TeX font metric, a font file format
 Thin-film composite membrane
 Total fatty matter, a method of describing the quality of soap
 Transportes Ferroviarios de Madrid, the concessionaire responsible for part of Madrid Metro Line 9
Traction force microscopy, technique for quantifying cell traction in extracellular matrix